The 1984 Australian Football Championships was an Australian football series between representative teams of the three major football states. Games involving Victoria were played under State of Origin rules, whilst the match between Western Australia and South Australia involved players based in their respective states at the time. The competition was won by Western Australia.

Results

Game 1 

|- style="background:#ccf;"
| Home team
| Home team score
| Away team
| Away team score
| Ground
| Crowd
| Date
| Time
| Broadcast Network
|- style="background:#fff;"
| Victoria
| 16.12 (108)
| South Australia
| 16.8 (104)
| Football Park
| 52,719
| 15 May 1984 
| 8:00pm
| Seven

 Fos Williams Medal: Stephen Kernahan (South Australia)

Game 2 

|- style="background:#ccf;"
| Home team
| Home team score
| Away team
| Away team score
| Ground
| Crowd
| Date
| Time
| Broadcast Network
|- style="background:#fff;"
| Western Australia
| 14.14 (98)
| South Australia
| 14.13 (97)
| Football Park
| 26,649
| 9 June 1984 
|
|

 Fos Williams Medal: Garry McIntosh (South Australia)

Game 3 

|- style="background:#ccf;"
| Home team
| Home team score
| Away team
| Away team score
| Ground
| Crowd
| Date
| Time
| Broadcast Network
|- style="background:#fff;"
| Western Australia
| 21.16 (142)
| Victoria
| 21.12 (138)
| Subiaco Oval
| 42,500
| 17 July 1984 
|
| Seven

 Simpson Medal: Brad Hardie (Western Australia)
 Tassie Medal: Brad Hardie (Western Australia)

Standings

Squads

References 

Australian rules interstate football
1984 in Australian rules football